The Oman First Division League (known as the Omantel First Division League for sponsorship purposes) is the second-highest Association football league in Oman. Contested by 13 teams, the top 2 teams replace the bottom two in the Oman Professional League while the third-placed team has a play-off facing the third last-laced team in order to gain promotion.
It is one of four divisions the Oman Football Association (Oman's main football governing body) encompasses, 
and has 12 teams while the Second Division and Third Division have 13 and 20 clubs each.

All First Division teams are entered in the Sultan Qaboos Cup draw. Two First Division teams made the quarter-finals in 2016.

The 2016-17 Oman First Division commenced on September 18. Al-Mussanah SC, Sur SC and Salalah SC were relegated to the 2016-17 Oman First Division League.

Leading in the 2016-17 Oman First Division (as of 20 February 2017) are newcomers Al-Salam SC, barely surpassing Al-Seeb Club on goal difference.

2015–16 Clubs
 Al-Kamil & Al wafi Club 
 Al-Mudhaibi Club 
 Al-Taliya Club
 Al-Ittihad Club (Salalah)
 Al-Rustaq Club 
 Ahli Sibab Club
 Bahla Club
 Al-Seeb Club 
 Bousher Club
 Jaalan Club
 Oman Club
 Mirbat Club
 Nizwa Club
 Al-Wahda SC

Source:

Note: Al-Rustaq Club, Oman Club and Jaalan Club all were promoted to the 2016-17 Oman Professional League.

2016–17 New Teams

 Al-Musannah SC (relegated from 2015-16 Oman Professional League)
 Sur SC (relegated from 2015-16 Oman Professional League)
 Salalah SC (relegated from 2015-16 Oman Professional League)
 Al-Salam SC (promoted from 2015-16 Oman Second Division League)
 Bidya Club (promoted from 2015-16 Oman Second Division League)

source for promoted clubs: http://www.goalzz.com/?c=11733

Winners

Source:

Golden Boot

 2014–15  Philip Oruwaseun Aremu

References

 
Sports leagues established in 1975
1975 establishments in Oman
Second level football leagues in Asia
Football leagues in Oman